For Jimmy, Wes and Oliver is a studio album by American jazz bassist Christian McBride together with his big band. This is the third release for McBride's big band; the band received Grammy Awards for its first two albums: The Good Feeling (2011) and Bringin' It (2017). The album also produced two singles: "Don Is" and "Medgar Evers Blues".

Background
The album is dedicated to jazz musicians Jimmy Smith, Wes Montgomery, and Oliver Nelson. The release is a mix of big band and quartet titles. McBride interprets 1966 recordings by Wes Montgomery and Jimmy Smith that produced the albums The Dynamic Duo and Further Adventures of Jimmy and Wes. For the 2019 recordings in his hometown of Montclair, New Jersey, McBride invited guitarist Mark Whitfield and organist Joey DeFrancesco, who takes on the role of Smith. Ten tracks were recorded: cover versions of the 1966 sessions, the original compositions ("Medgar Evers Blues" by Whitfield and "Pie Blues" by McBride and DeFrancesco), jazz compositions by Freddie Hubbard and Miles Davis ("Miles" from the 1958 album Milestones), and standards (such as "The Very Thought of You", "Down by the Riverside" and "I Want to Talk About You"). Four tracks were recorded by a quartet consisting of McBride, Mark Whitfield, Joey DeFrancesco, and Quincy Philips; the other six tracks are big-band recordings that mostly interpret the originals by Oliver Nelson. McBride explained, "Joey [DeFrancesco] is, without question, my oldest friend in music... We met in middle school playing in the Settlement Music School Jazz Ensemble in Philadelphia. We've recorded a few things here and there over the years, but we've never recorded an entire album together until now. It seemed logical to salute the two albums that we listened to quite a bit as kids."

Reception
JazzTimes review by Thomas Conrad stated, "This is not an album for adventurous listeners who require risk in their jazz. But this conservative, impeccably executed music is full of joie de vivre. In times like these, who can’t use more of that?" Matt Collar of AllMusic observed, "For Jimmy, Wes, and Oliver is an ebullient album that evokes the earthy, artful spirit of the trio who inspired it." John White of Jazz Journal mentioned, "This third release, if not quite up to the standards of the first two, and with a slightly misleading title, has much to recommend it." Matt Silver of WRTI wrote, "the fellas are so in their element here suggests that the boys will, indeed, always be boys." Gary Fukushima of DownBeat added, "More than 50 years ago, two musicians at the height of their careers met to make essential recordings. It's nice to know that sort of thing can still happen in 2020."

The album won Grammy Award for Best Large Jazz Ensemble Album at the 64th Annual Grammy Awards in 2022.

Track listing

Personnel
Main band
Christian McBride – producer, bass
Joey DeFrancesco – organ
Mark Whitfield – guitar
Quincy Phillips – drums

Trumpets
Frank Greene, Freddie Hendrix, Brandon Lee, Nabate Isles, Anthony Hervey

Trombones
Michael Dease, Steve Davis, James Burton, Douglas Purviance

Woodwinds
Steve Wilson (alto & soprano), Todd Bashore (alto), Ron Blake (tenor), Dan Pratt (tenor), Carl Maraghi (baritone)

References

External links
 Christian McBride Discography

2020 albums
Christian McBride albums
Mack Avenue Records albums